DeVerne Lee Calloway (June 17, 1916 - January 23, 1993) was an American politician who was the first black woman to serve in the Missouri state legislature.  She served as a Missouri state representative.  Calloway was educated at the Seventh Day Adventist Grammar School, LeMoyne College in Memphis, Atlanta University, Northwestern University, Pioneer Business Institute in Philadelphia, and Pendle Hill, a Quaker School in Wallingford, Pennsylvania.  She was married to Ernest A. Calloway, a longtime Teamster organizer who died three years before she did.  She and her husband published the Citizen Crusader which was later named the New Citizen.  This newspaper covered black politics and civil rights in St. Louis.

The DeVerne Lee Calloway Award named after her recognizes outstanding female leaders in Missouri.

References

External links
DeVerne Lee Calloway ourcampaigns.com

1916 births
1993 deaths
Women state legislators in Missouri
Democratic Party members of the Missouri House of Representatives
20th-century American politicians
20th-century American women politicians
African-American politicians